Xinuos OpenServer, previously SCO UNIX and SCO Open Desktop (SCO ODT), is a closed source computer operating system developed by Santa Cruz Operation (SCO), later acquired by SCO Group, and now owned by Xinuos. Early versions of OpenServer were based on UNIX System V, while the later OpenServer 10 is based on FreeBSD 10.

History

SCO UNIX/SCO Open Desktop
SCO UNIX was the successor to the Santa Cruz Operation's variant of Microsoft Xenix, derived from UNIX System V Release 3.2 with an infusion of Xenix device drivers and utilities. SCO UNIX System V/386 Release 3.2.0 was released in 1989, as the commercial successor to SCO Xenix. The base operating system did not include TCP/IP networking or X Window System graphics; these were available as optional extra-cost add-on packages. Shortly after the release of this bare OS, SCO shipped an integrated product under the name of SCO Open Desktop, or ODT. 1994 saw the release of SCO MPX, an add-on SMP package.

At the same time, AT&T completed its merge of Xenix, BSD, SunOS, and UNIX System V Release 3 features into UNIX System V Release 4. SCO UNIX remained based on System V Release 3, but eventually added home-grown versions of most of the features of Release 4.

The 1992 releases of SCO UNIX 3.2v4.0 and Open Desktop 2.0 added support for long file names and symbolic links. The next major version, OpenServer Release 5.0.0, released in 1995, added support for ELF executables and dynamically linked shared objects, and made many kernel structures dynamic.

SCO OpenServer
SCO OpenServer 5, released in 1995, would become SCO's primary product and serve as the basis for products like PizzaNet (the first Internet-based food delivery system done in partnership with Pizza Hut) and SCO Global Access, an Internet gateway server based on Open Desktop Lite. Due to its large installed base, SCO OpenServer 5 continues to be actively maintained by SCO with major updates having occurred as recently as September 2018.

SCO OpenServer 6, based on the merging of AT&T UNIX System V Release 4.2MP and UnixWare 7, was initially released by The SCO Group in 2005.  It includes support for large files, increased memory, and multi-threaded kernel (light-weight processes).  This merged codebase is referred to as UNIX System V Release 5 (SVR5) and was used only by SCO for OpenServer 6; SVR5 is not used by any other major developer or reseller.  SCO OpenServer 6 contains the UnixWare 7's SVR5 kernel integrated with SCO OpenServer 5 application and binary compatibility, OpenServer 5 system administration, and OpenServer 5 user environments.

SCO OpenServer has primarily been sold into the small and medium business (SMB) market. It is widely used in small offices, point of sale (POS) systems, replicated sites, and backoffice database server deployments. Prominent larger SCO OpenServer customers include McDonald's, Taco Bell, Big O Tires, Pizza Hut, Costco pharmacy, NASDAQ, The Toronto Stock Exchange, Banco do Brasil, many banks in Russia and China, and the railway system of India.

UnixWare merger

SCO purchased the right to distribute the UnixWare system and its System V Release 4 code base from Novell in 1995. SCO was eventually able to re-use some code from that version of UnixWare in later releases of OpenServer. Until Release 6, this came primarily in the compilation system and the UDI driver framework and the USB subsystem written to it.

By the end of the 1990s, there were around 15,000 value-added resellers (VARs) around the world who provided solutions for customers of SCO's Unix systems.

SCO announced on August 2, 2000, that it would sell its Server Software and Services Divisions, as well as UnixWare and OpenServer technologies, to Caldera Systems, Inc. The purchase was completed in May 2001. The remaining part of the SCO company, the Tarantella Division, changed its name to Tarantella, Inc., while Caldera Systems became Caldera International, and subsequently in 2002, the SCO Group.

Under The SCO Group

The SCO Group continued the development and maintenance of OpenServer. On June 22, 2005, OpenServer 6.0 was released, codenamed "Legend", the first release in the new 6.0.x branch. SCO OpenServer 6 is based on the UNIX System V Release 5 kernel, a merged codebase of UNIX System V Release 4.2MP and UnixWare 7.  OpenServer 6.0 features multi-threading application support for C, C++, and Java applications through the POSIX interface. OpenServer 6 features kernel-level threading (not found in 5.0.x).

Some improvements over OpenServer 5 include improved SMP support (support for up to 32 processors), support for files over a terabyte on a partition (larger network files supported through NFSv3), better file system performance, and support for up to 64GB of memory.

OpenServer 6.0 maintains backward-compatibility for applications developed for Xenix 286 onwards.

The SCO Group went bankrupt in 2011, after a long series of legal battles.

UnXis / Xinuos (2011–present)
The rights to OpenServer, as well as UnixWare, were acquired by UnXis in 2011, which was later renamed Xinuos.

In June 2015, Xinuos announced OpenServer 10, which is based on the FreeBSD 10 operating system. Simultaneously, Xinuos introduced a migration path for existing customers using older OS products. In December 2015, Xinuos released "definitive" versions of OpenServer 5, OpenServer 6, and UnixWare 7. 

In December 2017, Xinuos released "Definitive 2018" versions of OpenServer 6 and UnixWare 7, and in October 2018 OpenServer 5 Definitive 2018 was released. The "Definitive 2018" releases were a commitment by Xinuos to keep the legacy OS's updated and supported protecting the applications that customers need to continue to run. The Definitive 2018 products contain major updates over the Definitive releases and a soon to be announced updated development kit which will make it easier to compile current packages for the Definitive 2018 products.

However, by 2023, OpenServer 10 was no longer listed as a product on Xinuos' home page, implying that it had been withdrawn from marketing.

Versions

See also
 Santa Cruz Operation
 SCO v. Novell
 SCO Skunkware

References

External links
 SCO OpenServer 6.0 (deprecated) home page
 SCO OpenServer 5.0.7 (deprecated) home page
 SCO OS FAQ (3.2v4.2 and 3.2v5.0.x)
 Review in Linux Journal

FreeBSD
UNIX System V